Acoustic waves are a type of energy propagation through a medium by means of adiabatic loading and unloading. Important quantities for describing acoustic waves are acoustic pressure, particle velocity, particle displacement and acoustic intensity. Acoustic waves travel with a characteristic acoustic velocity that depends on the medium they're passing through. Some examples of acoustic waves are audible sound from a speaker (waves traveling through air at the speed of sound), seismic waves (ground vibrations traveling through the earth), or ultrasound used for medical imaging (waves traveling through the body).

Wave properties
Acoustic wave is a mechanical wave that transmits energy through the movements of atoms and molecules. Acoustic wave transmits through liquids in longitudinal manner (movement of particles are parallel to the direction of propagation of the wave); in contrast to electromagnetic wave that transmits in transverse manner (movement of particles at a right angle to the direction of propagation of the wave). However, in solids, acoustic wave transmits in both longitudinal and transverse manners due to absence of shear moduli in such a state of matter.

Acoustic wave equation

The acoustic wave equation describes the propagation of sound waves. The acoustic wave equation for sound pressure in one dimension is given by

where
 is sound pressure in Pa
 is position in the direction of propagation of the wave, in m
 is speed of sound in m/s
 is time in s

The wave equation for particle velocity has the same shape and is given by

where
 is particle velocity in m/s
For lossy media, more intricate models need to be applied in order to take into account frequency-dependent attenuation and phase speed. Such models include acoustic wave equations that incorporate fractional derivative terms, see also the acoustic attenuation article.

D'Alembert gave the general solution for the lossless wave equation. For sound pressure, a solution would be

where
 is angular frequency in rad/s
 is time in s
 is wave number in rad·m−1
 is a coefficient without unit

For  the wave becomes a travelling wave moving rightwards, for  the wave becomes a travelling wave moving leftwards.

Phase

In a travelling wave pressure and particle velocity are in phase, which means the phase angle between the two quantities is zero.

This can be easily proven using the ideal gas law

where
 is pressure in Pa
 is volume in m3
 is amount in mol
 is the universal gas constant with value 

Consider a volume . As an acoustic wave propagates through the volume, adiabatic compression and decompression occurs. For adiabatic change the following relation between volume  of a parcel of fluid and pressure  holds

where  is the adiabatic index without unit and the subscript  denotes the mean value of the respective variable.

As a sound wave propagates through a volume, the horizontal displacement of a particle  occurs along the wave propagation direction.

where
 is cross-sectional area in m2

From this equation it can be seen that when pressure is at its maximum, particle displacement from average position reaches zero. As mentioned before, the oscillating pressure for a rightward traveling wave can be given by

Since displacement is maximum when pressure is zero there is a 90 degrees phase difference, so displacement is given by 

Particle velocity is the first derivative of particle displacement: . Differentiation of a sine gives a cosine again

During adiabatic change, temperature changes with pressure as well following

This fact is exploited within the field of thermoacoustics.

Propagation speed

The propagation speed, or acoustic velocity, of acoustic waves is a function of the medium of propagation. In general, the acoustic velocity c is given by the Newton-Laplace equation:

where
C is a coefficient of stiffness, the bulk modulus (or the modulus of bulk elasticity for gas mediums),
 is the density in kg/m3

Thus the acoustic velocity increases with the stiffness (the resistance of an elastic body to deformation by an applied force) of the material, and decreases with the density.
For general equations of state, if classical mechanics is used, the acoustic velocity  is given by

Phenomena 

Acoustic waves are elastic waves that exhibit phenomena like diffraction, reflection and interference. Note that sound waves in air are not polarized since they oscillate along the same direction as they move.

Interference 
Interference is the addition of two or more waves that results in a new wave pattern. Interference of sound waves can be observed when two loudspeakers transmit the same signal. At certain locations constructive interference occurs, doubling the local sound pressure. And at other locations destructive interference occurs, causing a local sound pressure of zero pascals.

Standing wave

A standing wave is a special kind of wave that can occur in a resonator. In a resonator superposition of the incident and reflective wave occurs, causing a standing wave. Pressure and particle velocity are 90 degrees out of phase in a standing wave.

Consider a tube with two closed ends acting as a resonator. The resonator has normal modes at frequencies given by

where
 is the speed of sound in m/s
 is the length of the tube in m

At the ends particle velocity becomes zero since there can be no particle displacement. Pressure however doubles at the ends because of interference of the incident wave with the reflective wave. As pressure is maximum at the ends while velocity is zero, there is a 90 degrees phase difference between them.

Reflection
An acoustic travelling wave can be reflected by a solid surface. If a travelling wave is reflected, the reflected wave can interfere with the incident wave causing a standing wave in the near field. As a consequence, the local pressure in the near field is doubled, and the particle velocity becomes zero.

Attenuation causes the reflected wave to decrease in power as distance from the reflective material increases. As the power of the reflective wave decreases compared to the power of the incident wave, interference also decreases. And as interference decreases, so does the phase difference between sound pressure and particle velocity. At a large enough distance from the reflective material, there is no interference left anymore. At this distance one can speak of the far field.

The amount of reflection is given by the reflection coefficient which is the ratio of the reflected intensity over the incident intensity

Absorption
Acoustic waves can be absorbed. The amount of absorption is given by the absorption coefficient which is given by

where
 is the absorption coefficient without a unit
 is the reflection coefficient without a unit

Often acoustic absorption of materials is given in decibels instead.

Layered media 

When an acoustic wave propagates through a non-homogeneous medium, it will undergo diffraction at the impurities it encounters or at the interfaces between layers of different materials. This is a phenomenon very similar to that of the refraction, absorption and transmission of light in Bragg mirrors. The concept of acoustic wave propagation through periodic media is exploited with great success in acoustic metamaterial engineering. 

The acoustic absorption, reflection and transmission in multilayer materials can be calculated with the transfer-matrix method.

See also 

Acoustics
Acoustic attenuation
Acoustic metamaterial
Auditory imagery
Audio signal processing
Beat
Biot–Tolstoy–Medwin_diffraction_model
Diffraction
Doppler effect
Echo
Gravity wave
Music
Musical note
Musical tone
Phonon
Physics of music
Pitch
Psychoacoustics
Resonance
Refraction
Reflection
Reverberation
Signal tone
Sound
Sound localization
Soundproofing
Stereo imaging
Structural acoustics
Timbre
Ultrasound
Wave equation
One-way wave equation
List of unexplained sounds

References

Wave mechanics
Acoustics
Sound